David Hare is an English playwright.

He is known for his theatrical works including his acclaimed plays Pravda (1985), The Absence of War (1993), Skylight (1995), Amy's View (1997), and The Judas Kiss (1998). He is also known for his works on film and television. His famous film credits include Plenty (1985), The Hours (2002), and The Reader (2008) with his acclaimed television projects Page Eight (2011) and Collateral (2018).

Plays
Slag (1970)
The Great Exhibition (1972)
Brassneck (1973) (with Howard Brenton)
Knuckle (1974)
Fanshen (1975). Based on William H. Hinton, Fanshen: Documentary of Revolution in a Chinese Village (1966)
Teeth 'n' Smiles (1975)
Plenty (1978)
A Map of the World (1982)
Pravda (1985) (with Howard Brenton)
The Bay at Nice, and Wrecked Eggs (1986)
The Knife (1987) (with Nick Bicat and Tim Rose Price)
The Secret Rapture (1988)
Racing Demon (1990)
Murmuring Judges (1991)
The Absence of War (1993)
Skylight (1995; revived in London and on Broadway, in 2014 and 2015, respectively)
Amy's View (1997)
Ivanov (1997; revised and revived 2015) (adapted from Chekhov)
The Blue Room (1998) (adapted from Arthur Schnitzler)
The Judas Kiss (1998)
Via Dolorosa (1998)
My Zinc Bed (2000)
Platonov (2001; revived 2015) (adapted from Chekhov)
The Breath of Life (2002)
The Permanent Way (2003)
Stuff Happens (2004)
The Vertical Hour (2006)
Gethsemane (2008)
Berlin (2009)
Wall (2009)
The Power of Yes (2009)
South Downs (2011)
Behind the Beautiful Forevers (2014) (adapted from Behind the Beautiful Forevers)
The Seagull (2015) (adapted from Chekhov)
The Moderate Soprano (2015)
The Red Barn (2016) (adapted from La Main by Georges Simenon)
I'm Not Running (2018)
Beat the Devil (2020)
Straight Line Crazy (2022)

Filmography

Film 
Plenty (1985) - based on his play
Damage (1992)
The Secret Rapture (1993) - based on his play
The Hours (2002) - based on the novel by Michael Cunningham
The Reader (2008) - based on the novel by Bernhard Schlink
Denial (2016)

Television  
Licking Hitler (1978)
Dreams of Leaving (1980)
Wetherby (1985)
Strapless (1989)
The Absence of War (1995) - based on his play
My Zinc Bed (2008) - based on his play
Page Eight (2011) (also directed)
Turks & Caicos (2014) (also directed)
Salting the Battlefield (2014) (also directed)
The White Crow (2018)
Collateral (2018)
Roadkill (2020)
Beat the Devil (2021)

 Script only 
The Corrections (2007) - based on the novel by Jonathan Franzen
Murder in Samarkand (2008) - based on the memoir by Craig Murray, former British Ambassador to Uzbekistan

Directing credits
Licking Hitler for BBC1's Play for Today (1978)
Dreams of Leaving for BBC1's Play for Today (1980)
Wetherby (1985)
Paris by Night (1988)
Strapless (1989)
Paris, May 1919  (1993) (TV episode)
The Designated Mourner, written by Wallace Shawn (1989)
Heading Home (1991) (TV film)
The Year of Magical Thinking (2007) (Broadway play by Joan Didion starring Vanessa Redgrave)
Page Eight (2011) (also wrote)
Turks & Caicos (2014) (also wrote)
Salting the Battlefield (2014) (also wrote)

Bibliography

Books
Writing Left-Handed (Faber & Faber 1991)
Acting Up (A diary on his experiences of acting in his own play, the one-man-show on the topic of Israel/Palestine, Via Dolorosa)
 Obedience, Struggle and Revolt (Faber and Faber, 2005)
 About Hare by Richard Boon (Faber and Faber, 2006)
 The Blue Touch Paper (Faber and Faber, 2015)
 We Travelled: Essays and Poems (Faber and Faber, 2021)

Articles

References 

Plays by David Hare
20th-century English dramatists and playwrights
21st-century English dramatists and playwrights
Fellows of the Royal Society of Literature
Living people
People educated at Lancing College
Laurence Olivier Award winners
Fellows of the American Academy of Arts and Sciences
English screenwriters
English male screenwriters
English male dramatists and playwrights
Year of birth missing (living people)